The Yellow Diplomat (German: Der gelbe Diplomat) is a 1920 German silent film directed by Fred Sauer and starring Käthe Haack, Nien Soen Ling and Nien Tso Ling.

Cast
 Käthe Haack
 Nien Soen Ling
 Nien Tso Ling 
 Grete Lundt
 Fritz Schult
 Hermann Vallentin as Gesandter 
 Frederic Zelnik as Chinese Diplomat

References

Bibliography
 Bock, Hans-Michael & Bergfelder, Tim. The Concise CineGraph. Encyclopedia of German Cinema. Berghahn Books, 2009.

External links

1920 films
Films of the Weimar Republic
Films directed by Fred Sauer
German silent feature films
German black-and-white films